Samir Sabirovich Yusifov (born 11 February 1994) is a Russian professional football player. He also holds Azerbaijani citizenship.

He made his professional debut on 30 May 2015 for FK Yenisey Krasnoyarsk in a Russian Football National League game against FC Sokol Saratov.

He played for Neftchi Baku PFC in the Azerbaijan Cup.

External links
 Player profile by Russian Football National League

References

1994 births
Living people
Azerbaijani footballers
Russian footballers
Association football midfielders
Azerbaijani expatriate footballers
Expatriate footballers in Russia
Sumgayit FK players
FC Yenisey Krasnoyarsk players
FC Oryol players
Neftçi PFK players